Saeed Rashed Al-Qubaisi (born December 2, 1989) is an Emirati judoka, who played for the lightweight category. Al-Qubaisi became the first Emirati athlete to represent his nation in a combative sport at the 2008 Summer Olympics in Beijing. He lost the first preliminary match of the men's lightweight class (73 kg) to South Africa's Marlon August, who successfully scored an ippon and a kuchiki taoshi (single leg takedown), in one minute and twenty-seven seconds.

References

External links

NBC 2008 Olympics profile

1989 births
Living people
Emirati male judoka
Olympic judoka of the United Arab Emirates
Judoka at the 2008 Summer Olympics